

List of ski resorts
Arapahoe Basin
Aspen Highlands (Aspen)
Aspen Mountain (Aspen) (formerly Ajax)
Beaver Creek
Breckenridge
Bluebird Backcountry Ski Area
Buttermilk (Aspen)
Chapman Hill Ski Area
Copper Mountain
Cranor Ski Area
Crested Butte
Echo Mountain (ski area) (formerly Squaw Pass)
Eldora
Hesperus Ski Area
Howelsen Hill
Kendall Mountain
Keystone
Lake City Ski Hill
Lee's Ski Hill
Loveland
Monarch Mountain
Powderhorn Resort
Purgatory Resort (name changed back from Durango Mountain Resort in 2015) 
Silverton Mountain
Ski Cooper
Ski Granby Ranch (formerly SolVista Basin and Silver Creek)
Snowmass (Aspen)
Steamboat
Sunlight
Telluride
Vail
Winter Park/Mary Jane
Wolf Creek

Former Colorado ski areas
Adam's Rib
Arapahoe East Ski Area
Arrowhead (now part of Beaver Creek)
Baker Mountain
Berthoud Pass Ski Area
Climax
Coal Bank Pass
Conquistador
Cuchara Valley
Emerald Mountain
Fern Lake
Geneva Basin Ski Area
Hidden Valley
Hoosier Pass
Ildewild Ski Area
Ironton Park
Jones Pass
Libby Creek
Little Annie
Lizard Head Pass
Marble Mountain
Marshall Pass
Meadow Mountain
Mesa Creek
Montezuma Basin
Mount Lugo
Peak One
Pikes Peak
Pioneer
Porcupine Gulch
Red Mountain
Rock Creek
Rozman Hill
Saint Mary's Glacier
Seven Utes Mountain
Sharktooth
Ski Broadmoor
Ski Dallas
Steamboat Lake
Stoner
White Pine
Wolf Creek Pass (north of current Wolf Creek Ski Area)

See also
 List of ski areas and resorts in the United States
 List of New Mexico ski resorts
 Comparison of Colorado ski resorts

References

External links 
 Colorado Ski Country USA is the official website for information on Ski Resorts & Snow Reports
 Info on all the Colorado Ski Resorts
 Colorado Ski Resorts Comparison

 
Ski resorts
Ski resorts